The Dirac Medal is the name of four awards in the field of theoretical physics, computational chemistry, and mathematics, awarded by different organizations, named in honour of Professor Paul Dirac, one of the great theoretical physicists of the 20th century.

The Dirac Medal and Lecture (University of New South Wales) 
The first-established prize is the Dirac Medal for the Advancement of Theoretical Physics, awarded by the University of New South Wales, Sydney, Australia, jointly with the Australian Institute of Physics on the occasion of the public Dirac Lecture. The Lecture and the Medal commemorate the visit to the university in 1975 of Professor Dirac, who gave five lectures there. These lectures were subsequently published as a book: Directions of Physics (Wiley, 1978 – H. Hora and J. Shepanski, eds.). Professor Dirac donated the royalties from this book to the University for the establishment of the Dirac Lecture series. The prize, first awarded in 1979, includes a silver medal and honorarium.

Recipients 

 1979: Hannes Alfvén
 1981: John Clive Ward
 1983: Nicolaas Bloembergen
 1985: David Pines
 1987: Robert Hofstadter
 1988: Klaus von Klitzing
 1989: Carlo Rubbia & Kenneth G. Wilson
 1990: Norman F. Ramsey
 1991: Herbert A. Hauptman
 1992: Wolfgang Paul
 1996: Edwin Salpeter
 1998: David Deutsch
 2002: Heinrich Hora
 2003: 
 2004: Iosif Khriplovich
 2006: Sir Roger Penrose
 2007: John Iliopoulos
 2008: Harald Fritzsch
 2010: E. C. George Sudarshan
 2011: Lord May of Oxford
 2012: Brian Schmidt
 2013: Sir Michael Pepper
 2014: Serge Haroche
 2015: Subir Sachdev
 2016: Kenneth Freeman
 2017: Boris Altshuler
 2019: Lene Hau
 2020:  Susan Scott

Dirac Medal of the ICTP 
The Dirac Medal of the ICTP is given each year by the Abdus Salam International Centre for Theoretical Physics (ICTP) in honour of physicist Paul Dirac. The award, announced each year on 8 August (Dirac's birthday), was first awarded in 1985.

An international committee of distinguished scientists selects the winners from a list of nominated candidates. The Committee invites nominations from scientists working in the fields of theoretical physics or mathematics.

The Dirac Medal of the ICTP is not awarded to Nobel Laureates,  Fields Medalists, or Wolf Prize winners.
However, several Dirac Medallists have subsequently won one of these awards.

The medallists receive a prize of US$5,000.

Recipients 

 1985: Edward Witten, Yakov Zel'dovich
 1986: Alexander Polyakov, Yoichiro Nambu
 1987: Bruno Zumino, Bryce DeWitt
 1988: David J. Gross, Efim S. Fradkin
 1989: John H. Schwarz, Michael Green
 1990: Ludwig Faddeev, Sidney R. Coleman
 1991: Jeffrey Goldstone, Stanley Mandelstam
 1992: Nikolai Bogoliubov, Yakov G. Sinai
 1993: Daniel Z. Freedman, Peter van Nieuwenhuizen, Sergio Ferrara
 1994: Frank Wilczek
 1995: Michael Berry
 1996: Martinus J.G. Veltman, Tullio Regge
 1997: David Olive, Peter Goddard
 1998: Roman Jackiw, Stephen L. Adler
 1999: Giorgio Parisi
 2000: Helen Quinn, Howard Georgi, Jogesh Pati
 2001: John Hopfield
 2002: Alan Guth, Andrei Linde, Paul Steinhardt
 2003: Robert Kraichnan, Vladimir E. Zakharov
 2004: Curtis Callan, James Bjorken
 2005: Patrick A. Lee, Sir Samuel Frederick Edwards
 2006: Peter Zoller
 2007: Jean Iliopoulos, Luciano Maiani
 2008: Joe Polchinski, Juan Maldacena, Cumrun Vafa
 2009: Roberto Car, Michele Parrinello
 2010: Nicola Cabibbo, George Sudarshan
 2011: Édouard Brézin, John Cardy, Alexander Zamolodchikov
 2012: Duncan Haldane, Charles Kane, Shoucheng Zhang
 2013: Tom W. B. Kibble, Jim Peebles, Martin John Rees
 2014: Ashoke Sen, Andrew Strominger, Gabriele Veneziano
 2015: Alexei Kitaev, Greg Moore, Nicholas Read
 2016: Nathan Seiberg, Mikhail Shifman, Arkady Vainshtein
 2017: Charles H. Bennett, David Deutsch, Peter W. Shor
 2018: Subir Sachdev, Dam Thanh Son, Xiao-Gang Wen
 2019: Viatcheslav Mukhanov, Alexei Starobinsky, Rashid Sunyaev
 2020: André Neveu, Pierre Ramond, Miguel Virasoro 
 2021: Alessandra Buonanno, Thibault Damour, Frans Pretorius, Saul Teukolsky
 2022: Joel L. Lebowitz, Elliott H. Lieb, David P. Ruelle

Dirac Medal of the IOP
The Dirac Medal is a gold medal awarded annually by the Institute of Physics (Britain's and Ireland's main professional body for physicists) for "outstanding contributions to theoretical (including mathematical and computational) physics". The award, which includes a £1000 prize, was decided upon by the Institute of Physics in 1985, and first granted in 1987.

Recipients  

 1987: Stephen Hawking
 1988: John Stewart Bell
 1989: Roger Penrose
 1990: Michael Berry
 1991: Rudolf Peierls
 1992: Anthony Leggett
 1993: David Thouless
 1994: Volker Heine
 1995: Daniel Walls
 1996: John Pendry
 1997: Peter Higgs
 1998: David Deutsch
 1999: Ian Percival
 2000: John Cardy
 2001: Brian Ridley
 2002: 
 2003: Christopher Hull
 2004: Michael Green
 2005: John Ellis (CERN)  For his highly influential work on particle physics phenomenology; in particular on the properties of gluons, the Higgs boson and the top quark.
 2006:  (University College London)For his contributions to the development of atomic-scale computer simulations, which have greatly extended their power and effectiveness across an immense range of applications.
 2007: David Sherrington (University of Oxford)  For his pioneering work in spin glasses.
 2008: Bryan Webber (University of Cambridge)  For his pioneering work in understanding and applying quantum chromodynamics (QCD), the theory of the strong interaction which is one of the three fundamental forces of Nature.
 2009: Michael Cates (University of Edinburgh)  For pioneering work in the theoretical physics of soft materials, particularly in relation to their flow behaviour.
 2010: James Binney (University of Oxford)  For his contribution to our understanding of how galaxies are constituted, how they work and how they were formed.
 2011: Christopher Isham  (Imperial College London)  For his major contributions to the search for a consistent quantum theory of gravity and to the foundations of quantum mechanics.
 2012: Graham Garland Ross (University of Oxford)  For his theoretical work in developing both the Standard Model of fundamental particles and forces and theories beyond the Standard Model that have led to many new insights into the origins and nature of the universe.
 2013:  (University of Strathclyde)  For his wide ranging contributions throughout optics research, which both inspire and lead experimental endeavours.
 2014: Tim Palmer (University of Oxford)  For the development of probabilistic weather and climate prediction systems.
 2015: John Barrow (University of Cambridge)  For his combination of mathematical and physical reasoning to increase our understanding of the evolution of the universe, and his use of cosmology to increase our understanding of fundamental physics.
 2016: Sandu Popescu (University of Bristol)  For his fundamental and influential research into nonlocality and his contribution to the foundations of quantum physics.
 2017: Michael Duff (Imperial College London and Oxford University)  For sustained groundbreaking contributions to theoretical physics including the discovery of Weyl anomalies, for having pioneered Kaluza-Klein supergravity, and for recognising that superstrings in 10 dimensions are merely a special case of membranes in an 11-dimensional M-theory.
 2018: , University of Oxford for "his pioneering, deep, and distinctive contributions to condensed-matter theory, particularly in the quantum Hall effect, and to geometrically frustrated magnets."
 2019: Richard Keith Ellis, University of Durham for "his seminal work in quantum chromodynamics (QCD) where he performed many of the key calculations that led to the acceptance of QCD as the correct theory of the strong interaction."
 2020: Carlos Frenk, University of Durham for "outstanding contributions to establishing the current standard model for the formation of all cosmic structure, and for leading computational cosmology within the UK for more than three decades."
 2021: Steven Balbus, University of Oxford for "fundamental contributions to the theory of accretion-disc turbulence and the dynamical stability of astrophysical fluids, breaking new ground by establishing the critical role played by weak magnetic fields."

Dirac Medal of the WATOC 
The Dirac Medal is awarded annually by The World Association of Theoretical and Computational Chemists "for the outstanding computational chemist in the world under the age of 40". The award was first granted in 1998.

Recipients 
Source: WATOC

 1998: Timothy J. Lee
 1999: Peter M. W. Gill
 2000: Jiali Gao
 2001: Martin Kaupp
 2002: Jerzy Cioslowski
 2003: Peter Schreiner
 2004: Jan Martin
 2005: Ursula Röthlisberger 
 2006: Lucas Visscher
 2007: Anna Krylov
 2008: Kenneth Ruud
 2009: Jeremy Harvey
 2010: Daniel Crawford
 2011: Leticia González 
 2012: Paul Ayers
 2013: Filipp Furche 
 2014: Denis Jacquemin 
 2015: Edward Valeev
 2016: Johannes Neugebauer
 2017: Francesco Evangelista
 2018: Erin Johnson
 2019: Satoshi Maeda

See also
 List of physics awards
 List of awards named after people

References 

Physics awards
Awards of the Institute of Physics
Australian science and technology awards
British science and technology awards
Awards established in 1921